= Academic grading in Costa Rica =

Academic grading in Costa Rica is based on a 100-point scale.

For primary school level, a score of 65 is good enough to pass, while in high school and further levels the pass grade is 70/100. Students who attain between 60 and the passing grade get the chance to take an extra test that reviews the whole year's curriculum, and in which a 70 is needed to achieve a passing score.

Often, high schools will raise the pass grade to 75 in order to push their students to achieve a higher grade. This only applies to the highest high school grades, which are 10th and 11th grade. This method is primarily focused on improving grades by encouraging a higher cumulative grade point average throughout both years, leading towards a set of final exams in which this average grade becomes critically important.
